The AN/MPN-14K Mobile Ground Approach System can be configured as a complete Radar Approach Control (RAPCON) or Ground Controlled Approach (GCA) facility.

The radar unit is used by air traffic controllers to identify, sequence, and separate participating aircraft, provide final approach guidance through air defense corridors and zones, and coordinate ID and intent with local air defense units at assigned airports and air bases. These services can be provided in all types of weather.

The PAR provides both azimuth and elevation information from 15 NM to touchdown. Both the PAR and ASR can be used as final approach aids. The unit has three ASR display indicators and one PAR indicator located in the operations shelter, and one each ASR and PAR indicator located in the maintenance shelter. Complete operations are conducted from the operations trailer. The system is limited to a single runway but has the capability of providing opposite direction runway operations with the aid of a transportable turntable.

References
235th ATCS Equipment Accessed August 29, 2006.

Ground radars
Radars of the United States Air Force
Military equipment introduced in the 1990s